Saint-Constant is the name of several places:

 Saint-Constant, Quebec, Canada
Saint-Constant station
 Saint-Constant, Cantal, France

See also
 Saint Constant (died 777), Irish priest and hermit
 Saint Constantius
 Saint Constantine (disambiguation)